Enter Wildthyme is a novel by Paul Magrs featuring the characters of Iris Wildthyme and her companion, Panda. It is the first in a series of Iris Wildthyme novels published by Snowbooks.

References

2011 British novels
Novels by Paul Magrs